Elizabeth Hay, Countess of Erroll (née FitzClarence; 17 January 1801 – 16 January 1856) was an illegitimate daughter of King William IV of the United Kingdom and Dorothea Jordan.  She married William Hay, 18th Earl of Erroll, and became Countess of Erroll on 4 December 1820 at age 19.  Due to Hay's parentage, William Hay became Lord Steward of the Household. Elizabeth and William Hay married at St George's, Hanover Square. Hay is pictured in a FitzClarence family portrait in House of Dun, and kept a stone thrown at her father William IV and the gloves he wore on opening his first Parliament as mementos.

In 1856, while ill herself, she was summoned from Scotland to visit her dying brother Adolphus. Her illness worsened and she died on the journey in Edinburgh, Scotland.

Children and descendants
Elizabeth and William Hay together had four children.

Lady Ida Harriet Augusta Hay (18 October 1821 – 22 October 1867), was one of Queen Victoria's bridesmaids, was the Hays' firstborn child and daughter. She married Charles Noel, 2nd Earl of Gainsborough and had five children. Her descendants include the Earls of Gainsborough, the Marquesses of Bute and the Baronets of Bellingham.
William Hay, 19th Earl of Erroll (3 May 1823 – 3 December 1891), wed to Eliza Amelia Gore on 20 September 1848, was the second child and firstborn son.
Lady Agnes Georgiana Elizabeth Hay (12 May 1829 – 18 December 1869), wed to James Duff on 16 March 1846, was the third child and second daughter. Lady Agnes Hay's son, Alexander Duff, married Princess Louise, daughter of King Edward VII.
Lady Alice Mary Emily Hay (7 July 1835 – 7 June 1881), wed to Charles Edward Louis Casimir Stuart (1824–1882; known also popularly as Count d'Albanie) nephew of fraud John Sobieski Stuart, was the final child and daughter of the Hays.

Former British Prime Minister David Cameron is a fourth great-grandson of Lady Erroll, thus making him the fifth cousin twice removed to Queen Elizabeth II according to Debrett's.

Ancestry

References

Bibliography
 Walford, Edward, "Hardwicke's Annual biography" (1857) p. 209
 de Vere Beauclerk-Dewar, Peter, Roger S. Powell, "Right Royal Bastards: The Fruits of Passion" (2007) 

1801 births
1856 deaths
19th-century British women
Illegitimate children of William IV of the United Kingdom
Scottish countesses
FitzClarence family
19th-century Scottish people
19th-century Scottish women
Daughters of British marquesses
Daughters of kings